The Catalonia national football team is the official football team of Catalonia. It is organised by the Catalan Football Federation, founded in 1900. The team has been referred to by various names including ,  and the Catalan XI.

As the Catalan Federation is affiliated with the  Royal Spanish Football Federation as one of the several Spanish regional football federations, Catalonia cannot be affiliated with either FIFA or UEFA as a national member association and is therefore not allowed to participate in official competitions for national teams such as the FIFA World Cup or the UEFA European Championship. Other than in certain cases where other nationalities are involved, Catalan players are full Spanish citizens who are eligible to play for Spain, and often do.

Since 1904, the team has played nearly 200 games against various national, regional and club teams. International friendly games have been played more regularly since 1997. Among the teams they have played are Nigeria, Brazil, and Argentina.

History

First games
The Catalonia team made their debut in 1905 Initially they played against various club teams such as Club Espanyol, Madrid CF, FC Barcelona and Irún Sporting Club. On 24 July 1910, they played their first-ever international game against a Paris XI, which they lost 1-3, with the author of the Catalan goals being Carles Comamala. The team was: Costa, Bru, Halden, Massana, Aguirreche, Sampere, Barenys, Angoso, Berdié, Comamala and Roteta. On 20 February 1912, they made their international friendly debut against France, losing 7–0 in Paris. The team was: Reñé, Irízar, Amechazurra, German, Peris, Kinké, Forns, Pepe Rodríguez, Comamala, Morales and Ramirez. On 1 December 1912, the two teams met again in Barcelona and this time the Catalans won 1–0 thanks to a goal from Genaro de la Riva of RCD Espanyol.

On 8 December 1912, Catalonia faced a selection of foreigners at the Camp de la Indústria in a benefit match for the Sindicat de Periodistes, ending in a 5–2 win for the Catalans with goals from Massana (2), C. Comamala, Wallace (own goal) and Forns, while the foreign goalscorers were Wallace and Stewart. The Catalan team was: Renyé, Amechazurra, Irízar, A. Massana, Sagnier, Quirante, Armet-Kinké, A. Comamala, C. Comamala, Janer and Forns. The Selection of foreigners was: Manchan, Braussendorf, Wallace, Rositzky, Greenwell, Morris, Allack, Kaiser, Steel, Stewart and McLean. In 1914, the Catalan XI played the Basque Country XI for the first time, but there is no record of the result, while the first recorded game between the two teams took place on 3 January 1915 at San Mamés Stadium, which ended in a 6–1 loss to the Catalan side.

Copa Príncep d'Astúries

Between 1915 and 1926, the Catalan XI competed in the Copa Príncep d'Astúries, an inter-regional competition. They finished as runners-up in 1915 and won for the first time in 1916, beating a Castile/Madrid XI 8–5 over two games, including a shocking 6–3 win in the first leg at the Campo de O'Donnell in Madrid. They then relinquished the trophy in 1917 after losing 2–0 to a weak Castile XI side. During the 1920s, a team featuring Josep Samitier, Paulino Alcántara, Sagibarba and Ricardo Zamora helped the Catalan XI win the competition in 1924 and 1926. In the quarter-finals of the former, Catalonia defeated a Gipuzkoa XI featuring René Petit by a score of 2–1, and then beat Biscay XI 1–0 in the semi-finals with the solitary goal being scored by Cristóbal Martí. The final was played on 24 February 1924 in San Mamés against a Castile/Madrid XI, and the game was a tremendously competitive clash, with back-and-forth drama on the scoreboard, but at the end of regulation time the match was tied at 3–3 with Samitier (twice) and Piera scoring the Catalan goals. In extra-time Juan Monjardín appeared to have won the game for the Castile/Madrid XI when he scored past Zamora, but with two minutes remaining Emili Sagi-Barba leveled the scores at 4–4 when no one was expecting it anymore, and the draw forced a replay two days later and this time Catalonia ended up winning 3-2 with goals from Carulla, Samitier and Piera, thus becoming champion. The Catalan team that lined-up that day was: Zamora, Massaguè, Montané, Caicedo, Sancho, Carulla, Piera, Martí, Peidró, Samitier and Sagibarba. The last edition of the competition was a two-legged final between the winners of the previous two, Asturias XI and Catalonia, who faced each other only for the right to keep the trophy, and Catalonia won both games (2–0 and 4–3), thus earning the right to keep the trophy. The Catalan goalscorers were Domingo Broto(2), Josep Forgas(2), Juan Pellicer and Paulino Alcántara.

As well as playing other regional teams from throughout Spain and Europe, the 1920s also saw the Catalan XI play several international friendly matches. On 13 March 1924, at the Camp de Les Corts, the Catalan XI played Spain for the first time. The Spain XI included Josep Samitier and Zamora, two of the best Catalan players of the era, while the Catalan XI featured Alcántara and Sagibarba. Samiter scored twice to help Spain to a 7–0 win. On 13 December 1925, Samitier, Zamora, Alcántara and Sagibarba were on the same side as the Catalan XI beat Czechoslovakia at the Estadi de Sarrià. After conceding a penalty and going down 1–0, Sagibarba then equalized with another penalty before Samitier clinched a 2–1 win. On 7 July 1926, the Catalan XI played Czechoslovakia in Prague. Despite Samitier putting the Catalans 1–0 ahead, they eventually lost 2–1.

Catalonia vs. Brazil
During the 1930s, Catalonia continued playing friendly games against an array of teams; 1934 was a particularly good year. On 2 February, they played Spain and lost 2–0 at Les Corts. Four months later, they played Brazil twice. On 17 June, the Catalan XI beat Brazil 2–1 at Les Corts and then on 24 June, they held them to a 2–2 draw at the Vista Alegre in Girona. The Brazil team had been in Europe to play in the official 1934 FIFA World Cup and included the legendary Leônidas in their team. The Catalan XI completed a good month when on June 29 they beat the reigning official La Liga champions, Athletic Bilbao, 5–1.

The Franco era
After the Spanish Civil War, caudillo Francisco Franco imposed several restrictions on Catalonia, abolishing the Generalitat de Catalunya and banning the official use of the Catalan language and the Catalan flag. Despite these restrictions, the Catalan XI continued to play regularly during this period and even played Spain twice. On 19 October 1947, at the Sarrià and with a team featuring Juan Velasco, Marià Gonzalvo, Joan Segarra and César, they beat Spain 3–1. On 9 August 1953, Spain avenged this defeat with a 6–0 win.

During this era, several notable Barcelona players, including the Spanish players László Kubala, Luis Suárez, Evaristo and later Chus Pereda, played for the Catalan XI. On 26 January 1955, in a friendly game against Bologna at Les Corts, Kubala was also joined by another guest player, Alfredo Di Stéfano. The Catalan XI won 6–2 with two goals from Kubala and one from Di Stéfano. On 1 September 1956, Di Stéfano returned to Les Corts with Real Madrid, recent winners of the first official European Cup, and played a Selecció de Barcelona. Real won the game 7–3.

The Catalan XI marked the end of the Franco era with a friendly game against the Soviet Union at the Camp Nou on 6 June 1976. The team included Carles Rexach, guest Netherlands players Johan Cruyff and Johan Neeskens and Chilean international Carlos Caszely who played for Espanyol. The game finished 1–1 with Neeskens scoring for the Catalan XI. Cruyff's son, Jordi, would subsequently play regularly for the Catalan XI.

Democratic era

Since the restoration of democracy in the 1970s, the Catalonia representative team has regularly played international friendly matches. They put together a string of successful results against countries like Bulgaria, Nigeria, Yugoslavia, Lithuania and Chile. On 5 May 2002, Catalonia hosted Brazil in a warm up friendly game before the official 2002 World Cup. Brazil, who went on to win the official competition, beat Catalonia 3–1. In 2004, Brazil returned for a second friendly game and this time won 5–2 at the Camp Nou, where some months later Argentina defeated Catalonia 3–0. The last friendly matches have been against Paraguay, Costa Rica, Basque Country, Argentina and Colombia.

Johan Cruyff era
On 2 November 2009, it was announced that Dutch legend and former Barcelona manager Johan Cruyff would be the new coach of Catalonia. On 22 December 2009, they played a friendly against Argentina, which ended in a Catalonia win, 4–2 at Camp Nou. On 28 December 2010, Catalonia played another friendly against Honduras winning 4–0 at Estadi Olímpic Lluís Companys. On 30 December 2011, Catalonia played Tunisia in a goalless draw at the Lluís Companys. In their last game under Cruyff, on 2 January 2013, Catalonia drew with Nigeria at the Cornellà-El Prat, 1–1.

Post-Cruyff era
Former player Gerard was appointed new coach for the Catalan team for two years. His first match with the team took place on 30 December 2013 against Cape Verde at the Olímpic Lluís Companys.

Fixtures and results

2022

Coaching staff

Manager history
Pichi Alonso (1995–2005)
Pere Gratacós (2005–2009)
Johan Cruyff (2009–2013)
Gerard López (2013–2016)
Sergio González (2015–2018)
Gerard López (2018–present)

Players
Due to the unofficial status of the Catalonia team and others, many of the usual conventions of international football do not apply. Players who have already appeared for a FIFA national team can play for the Catalans in addition, but if they are simultaneously called up for both, the FIFA squad (usually Spain) takes precedence. Clubs are also not obligated to release their players, and the request is sometimes refused by clubs outwith the Spanish leagues, or when the fixture takes place during the domestic season and the club has important upcoming fixtures. Eligible players can also choose not to be involved. This means the Catalan squads are frequently below what would be considered their 'full strength', but also means those who do take part are fully committed to the concept, and in many cases would have no other opportunities to experience international football so consider the match to be an important matter. This contrasts with their opponents, as the fixture does not contribute to their Association ranking points or individual cap totals and is thus one of the least significant matches out of several they would play each year. In combination with home advantage for the Catalan team in most of their fixtures, this has led to the results falling in their favour more often than might be expected compared to other nations perceived to have a similar standard of players.

Current squad
The following players were called up for the friendly match against , on 25 May 2022. 
''All caps and goals as of May 2022 after match against .

Recent call-ups
The following players have been called up for the team within the last played matches and are still available for selection.

WD = Player withdrew from the squad due to non-injury issue.

Notable players
For a list of recent Catalonia national team players, see here
For a list of players from Catalonia who have represented FIFA national teams, see here

Guest players

Because Catalonia is not a member of either UEFA or FIFA due to it being a region of Spain and plays only in unofficial friendly matches, normal eligibility rules based on birthplace do not apply, and a number of players who were not born in Catalonia and played for other international teams have guested for the Catalan XI, although this is much less frequent in the 21st century. With the notable exception of Alfredo Di Stéfano, most were playing for Barcelona or Espanyol at the time. Some of these players, such as Andrés Iniesta, César Rodríguez, Francisco Bru, Guillermo Amor and Pepe Reina had lived a large part of their lives in Catalonia due to their football careers.

 
 
 Andrés Iniesta
 César Rodríguez
 Chus Pereda
 Francisco Bru
 Gallego
 Guillermo Amor
 José Bravo
 José Luis Zabala
 José María
 Josema Rodilla
 Juan José Nogués
 Juan Velasco
 Juan Verdugo Pérez
 Luis Suárez
 Manuel Osorio
 Manuel Polinario
 Manuel Sanchis Martinez
 Marcial Pina
 Miguel Ángel Ochoa
 Nando García
 Pepe Reina
 Quique Costas
 Rosendo Hernández
 Severiano Goiburu
 Simón Lecue

Other countries
 
 Alejandro Morera Soto
 Carlos Caszely
 Dagoberto Moll
 Enrique Fernández
 Eulogio Martínez
 Evaristo de Macedo
 Hristo Stoichkov
 Hugo Sotil
 Johan Neeskens
 László Kubala
 Luis César Ortiz
 Marcel Domingo
 Melanio Olmedo
 Nasko Sirakov

Honours
Copa Príncep d'Astúries
Winners (3): 1916, 1923–24 and 1926
Runners-Up (2): 1915 and 1917

Head-to-head record

See also

 Spain national football team
 Catalonia national basketball team
 Catalan football championship
 Catalonia women's national football team

Notes and references

Notes

References

External links

Catalonia Football Federation
Results at rsssf.com
Detailed results at www.futcat.org/html
List of games at www.esportcatala.cat
Copa Príncep d'Astúries

 
European national and official selection-teams not affiliated to FIFA
Football
Spanish autonomous football teams
Sports organizations established in 1905
1905 establishments in Spain